Chest Full of Dying Hawks ('95 - '01) is a promotional compilation album of earlier material written by Sparklehorse, released in 2001 by Capitol Records in the United States.  The release came in limited edition, and featured songs from the first three studio albums, as well as three tracks from three other Sparklehorse EPs.

Track listing

References

External links 
Chest Full of Dying Hawks on Allmusic
Chest Full of Dying Hawks on Last.fm
Chest Full of Dying Hawks on Amazon

Sparklehorse albums
2001 compilation albums